Sharon Chan Man-chi (born 17 January 1979) is a Hong Kong actress and model. She is currently under contract with TVB in Hong Kong.

Filmography

Television dramas

Film

Books
 陳敏之《戀愛敏感》

TVB Songs
Song Name : Love Steps (逐格重播): At Home with Love (樓住有情人主題曲) (2006)
Song Name : The Circle Game: Glittering Days (東方之珠片尾曲) (2006)

References

External links
Official TVB Blog of Sharon Chan 
Official Yahoo! Blog of Sharon Chan 
Sharon Chan on Sina Weibo 
Sharon Chan on Instagram

|-
! colspan="3" style="background: #DAA520;" | TVB Anniversary Awards
|-

|-
! colspan="3" style="background: #DAA520;" | My AOD Favourites Awards
|-

1979 births
Living people
Hong Kong female models
Hong Kong film actresses
Hong Kong television actresses
TVB veteran actors
20th-century Hong Kong actresses
21st-century Hong Kong actresses